Emil Friedrich Kautzsch (4 September 1841 – 7 May 1910) was a German Hebrew scholar and biblical critic, born at Plauen, Saxony.

Biography 
He was educated at Leipzig, in whose theological faculty he was appointed privatdozent (1869) and professor (1871).  Subsequently he held chairs at Basel (1872–80), where he received an honorary Swiss citizenship and made friends with Friedrich Nietzsche, after which he moved to Tübingen (1880–88) until receiving a professorship at Halle in 1888.
 
Kautzsch traveled to Ottoman Palestine in 1876, and became one of the founding members of the "German Society for the Exploration of Palestine" (Deutscher Palästina-Verein) the following year.  He was also one of the editors of the Theologische Studien und Kritiken, beginning in 1888.

Published works 
Kautzsch edited the following works:
 The 8th edition of Hermann Scholz's Abriss der Hebräischen Laut- und Formenlehre, (1899).
 The 10th and 11th editions of Hagenbach's Encyklopädie und Methodologie (1880-1884).
 The 22nd through the 28th editions of Gesenius' Hebräische Grammatik, (last edition published in 1909).

In addition, Kautzsch wrote:
 De Veteris Testamenti Locis a Paulo Apostolo Allegatis, (1869).
 Die Echtheit der moabitischen Altertümer geprüft, (Strassburg, 1876).
 
 
 Textbibel des Alten und Neuen Testaments, (Tübingen: J.C.B. Mohr, 1899), with Karl Weizsäcker, later Karl von Weizsäcker, grandfather of Richard von Weizsäcker. Both were honored for this work with a nobility title, which Kautzsch refused and asked for the Swiss citizenship instead.
 Apokryphen und Pseudepigraphen des Alten Testaments, (1900), with other scholars.
 
 Heilige Schrift des Alten Testaments, (3rd edition, 1908–10), with other scholars.
 Biblische Theologie des Alten Testaments, (Tübingen: J.C.B. Mohr, 1911), published posthumously.

References

External links 

 
 

German Hebraists
Christian Hebraists
Academic staff of Leipzig University
Academic staff of the University of Tübingen
Academic staff of the Martin Luther University of Halle-Wittenberg
Academic staff of the University of Basel
Leipzig University alumni
People from the Kingdom of Saxony
1841 births
1910 deaths
German male non-fiction writers
People from Plauen